The Bergrivier Local Municipality council consists of thirteen members elected by mixed-member proportional representation. Seven councillors are elected by first-past-the-post voting in seven wards, while the remaining six are chosen from party lists so that the total number of party representatives is proportional to the number of votes received. In the election of 1 November 2021 the Democratic Alliance (DA) obtained a majority of eight seats on the council.

Results 
The following table shows the composition of the council after past elections.

December 2000 election

The following table shows the results of the 2000 election.

By-elections from October 2002 to August 2004
The following by-elections were held to fill vacant ward seats in the period between the floor crossing periods in October 2002 and September 2004.

September 2004 floor crossing

In terms of the Eighth Amendment of the Constitution, in the period from 1–15 September 2004 councillors had the opportunity to cross the floor to a different political party without losing their seats. In the Bergrivier council one Democratic Alliance councillor left the party to sit as an independent.

March 2006 election

The following table shows the results of the 2006 election.

By-elections from September 2007 to May 2011
The following by-elections were held to fill vacant ward seats in the period between the floor crossing period in September 2007 and the election in May 2011.

May 2011 election

The following table shows the results of the 2011 election.

By-elections from May 2011 to August 2016
The following by-elections were held to fill vacant ward seats in the period between the elections in May 2011 and August 2016.

August 2016 election

The following table shows the results of the 2016 election.

The local council sends two representatives to the council of the West Coast District Municipality: one from the Democratic Alliance and one from the African National Congress.

By-elections from August 2016 to November 2021
The DA subsequently lost one seat to the African National Congress (ANC) in a by-election on 23 August 2017. However, the DA won the ward back in another by-election held on 16 January 2019. The 2016 council composition was thus restored.

November 2021 election

The following table shows the results of the 2021 election.

Notes

References

Bergrivier
Elections in the Western Cape